The 1950–51 Michigan Wolverines men's basketball team represented the University of Michigan in intercollegiate basketball during the 1950–51 season.  The team finished the season in a tie for ninth place in the Big Ten Conference with an overall record of 7–15 and 3–11 against conference opponents.

Ernie McCoy was in his third year as the team's head coach.  Leo VanderKuy was the team's leading scorer with 329 points in 22 games for an average of 15.0 points per game.  Chuck Murray was the team captain.

Statistical leaders

References

Michigan
Michigan Wolverines men's basketball seasons
Michigan Wolverines basketball
Michigan Wolverines basketball